Kodi Amman Temple is a Hindu temple situated at Sungan Thidal, 2 kilometres from the town of Thanjavur on the Thanjavur-Kumbakonam road.

References 

 

Hindu temples in Thanjavur